Giorgio Vido (born 1 April 1941 in Padua) is an Italian politician. Elected to the Italian Chamber of Deputies for the Liga Veneta-Lega Nord, he left the party in 1994.

In 2000 he contributed to the foundation of the Fronte Marco Polo with Fabio Padovan. After a dismal result in the 2000 regional elections (1.2%) he managed to merge his party with the Veneti d'Europa. The new party was called Liga Fronte Veneto and Giorgio Vido was national secretary from 2001 to 2003.

References

1941 births
Living people
Politicians from Padua
Venetist politicians
Members of the Chamber of Deputies (Italy)
Lega Nord politicians
20th-century Italian politicians
21st-century Italian politicians